If You Ain't Lovin' (You Ain't Livin')" is a song written by Tommy Collins and originally recorded by country music artist Faron Young.

George Strait version

It was also covered by George Strait on his album If You Ain't Lovin', You Ain't Livin'. His version became his 15th number 1 single in the U.S.

Critical reception
Kevin John Coyne of Country Universe gave the song a B− grade, saying that it "features Strait singing in such an exaggerated twang that the entire proceedings feel more campy than country."

Chart performance
"If You Ain't Lovin'" reached number two for three weeks on the Billboard Hot Country Songs chart for Faron Young in 1954.

George Strait's version was a chart topper in 1988, his eighth consecutive single to do so. Its chart performance on the Canadian RPM Country Tracks chart is unknown.

Faron Young

George Strait

References

1954 singles
1988 singles
1954 songs
Faron Young songs
George Strait songs
Songs written by Tommy Collins (singer)
Song recordings produced by Jimmy Bowen
Capitol Records singles
MCA Records singles